Presidential elections were held in El Salvador on 7 March 1999. The result was a victory for Francisco Flores of the Nationalist Republican Alliance, who won in the first round with 51.96% of the vote.

Results

References

El Salvador
Presidential elections in El Salvador
1999 in El Salvador